Sergey Tsybenko (born 9 December 1973) is a Kazakhstani speed skater. He competed at the 1994 Winter Olympics, the 1998 Winter Olympics and the 2002 Winter Olympics.

References

External links
 

1973 births
Living people
Kazakhstani male speed skaters
Olympic speed skaters of Kazakhstan
Speed skaters at the 1994 Winter Olympics
Speed skaters at the 1998 Winter Olympics
Speed skaters at the 2002 Winter Olympics
Sportspeople from Semey
Asian Games medalists in speed skating
Speed skaters at the 1996 Asian Winter Games
Speed skaters at the 1999 Asian Winter Games
Speed skaters at the 2003 Asian Winter Games
Asian Games bronze medalists for Kazakhstan
Medalists at the 1996 Asian Winter Games
21st-century Kazakhstani people